The 1920 Bay of Plenty by-election was a by-election held in the  electorate in the Bay of Plenty during the term of the 20th New Zealand Parliament on 30 September 1920.

After the death of William MacDonald of the Liberal Party he was replaced by Kenneth Williams of the Reform Party.

Frederick Lynsar, the Liberal candidate who lost to the Reform candidate, was Chairman of the Gisborne Harbour Board and an ex-chairman of the Cook County Council. He was described as a "staunch supporter" of James Carroll and William MacDonald.

Results
The following table gives the election results:

References

Bay of Plenty 1920
1920 elections in New Zealand
Politics of the Bay of Plenty Region